Phil Lloyd is an Australian actor and scriptwriter and partner in the production company Jungleboys. He is best known for his acting role as Myles Barlow in the Australian TV series, Review with Myles Barlow and the comedy series At Home with Julia, where he played Tim Mathieson, the partner of prime minister Julia Gillard.

Phil has been a scriptwriter for a number of years. Since 2004 he has been part of Australian soap opera Home and Away's core writing team. He also served as an associate script co-producer (a role shared with scriptwriter Faith McKinnon) for about eighteen months.

Phil became more well known in 2008 with the debut of Review with Myles Barlow, which he co-wrote with Trent O'Donnell, and starred in as Myles. He received Australian Film Institute Awards in 2009 and 2010 for both Best Performance in a Television Comedy Series and Best Television Comedy Series.

Phil is co-creator, co-writer, co-star (as Prime Minister Julia Gillard's romantic partner Tim Mathieson) of the sitcom At Home with Julia, which aired on ABC1 from 7 September 2011.

In 2012 he wrote and produced the ABC TV series "A Moody Christmas" for Jungleboys Australia.

In 2013 he created, was a contributing writer and acted in "The Elegant Gentleman's Guide to Knife Fighting", a sketch comedy show for the ABC TV.

Phil's writing credits also include FarmKids and The Trophy Room.

Lloyd together with Trent O’Donnell, both from Jungle Entertainment, were awarded the Fred Parsons Award for Outstanding Contribution to Australian Comedy at the AWGIE Awards 2022.

References

External links
 

Australian male soap opera actors
Living people
Year of birth missing (living people)